The Adjutant General of Connecticut is the highest-ranking military officer in the Armed Forces of the State of Connecticut which includes the Connecticut National Guard, the four units of the Governor's Guards, the Connecticut State Guard, the Connecticut State Guard Reserve and the Connecticut Naval Militia.  The current Adjutant General is Major General Francis J. Evon, Jr.  He was appointed to a four-year term effective July 1, 2018.

Appointment
The Governor of the State of Connecticut appoints the Adjutant General to a four-year term beginning on July 1 in the same year of the state's gubernatorial election.  The Adjutant General is required to have a minimum of fifteen years of commissioned service in the Armed Forces of the United States and have obtained the rank of Lieutenant Colonel or Commander.  The Adjutant General can have served in any branch of the United States military and there is no requirement that they must have served in the National Guard.  The Adjutant General can not be appointed or continue to serve once they have reached the age of sixty-four.

History
On May 11, 1637, the General Courts of the Connecticut Colony established a military arm of the government.  This organization was the forerunner to the Connecticut Military Department in which its head is the Adjutant General.  The position of Adjutant General was first officially established within Connecticut Law in 1784.  "And be it further enacted that there shall be from Time to Time appointed, as may be necessary, by Warrant one Adjutant General over the whole Militia of this State.'   Originally there was no requirement of prior military service.  In 1796, the Connecticut Acts & Laws were further update in accordance with national law in which the duties of the Adjutant General were defined to be to distribute all orders from the Commander-in-Chief of the state to the several Corps and to attend all public reviews where the Commander-in-Chief of the state will review the militia.  In 1939, the Military Department was established in order to consolidate all armed forces of the state under the Adjutant General.  This included the units of the Governor's Guards and Naval Militia as well as the National Guard.  The Connecticut Office of Civil Defense was established in 1959 and became a subordinate agency of the Connecticut Military Department under the authority of the Adjutant General to respond to natural disasters, civil disturbances and other events.  The office was renamed in 1973 to the Office of Civil Preparedness and in 1979, both organizations became subordniate to the Department of Public Safety, the agency which also included the State Police.  The Adjutant General regained authority of the Office of Civil Preparedness in 1999, which was renamed the Office of Emergency Management in 1988.  This was short-lived as in 2004 the Adjutant General once again lost authority over he Office of Emergency Management which was merged into a new state agency, the Department of Emergency Management and Homeland Security.  The Adjutant General still maintains responsibility for readying the National Guard to respond to domestic issues as required by the Governor, but works in coordination with the now Department of Emergency Services and Public Protection, which has primary responsibility for planning and responding to natural disasters and other domestic responses.

List of Adjutants General of the State of Connecticut

References

See also

Connecticut National Guard
Current State Adjutants General

Military in Connecticut
Connecticut-related lists
History of Connecticut
Connecticut National Guard
Connecticut Adjutant Generals
Military personnel from Connecticut